Not For, or Against (Quite the Contrary) (original title: Ni pour, ni contre (bien au contraire)) is a 2003 French crime drama film directed and co-written by Cédric Klapisch. It stars Marie Gillain and Vincent Elbaz.

Cast 
 Marie Gillain as Caty
 Vincent Elbaz as Jean 
 Simon Abkarian as Lecarpe
 Zinedine Soualem as Mouss
 Dimitri Storoge as Loulou 
 Natacha Lindinger as Caprice 
 Jocelyn Lagarrigue as Gilles
 Diane Kruger as a call girl 
 Michaël Abiteboul as Bernard
 Camille Natta as Liz
 Cédric Klapisch as a journalist

References

External links 
 

2003 films
2003 crime drama films
2000s heist films
French crime drama films
French heist films
2000s French-language films
Films directed by Cédric Klapisch
2000s French films